North Butler Community School District, also referred to as North Butler Schools, is a rural public school district headquartered in Allison, Iowa. 
The district occupies parts of Butler and Floyd counties, and it serves Greene, Allison, and Bristow.

History
It was established on July 1, 2011, as a merger of the Greene Community School District and Allison–Bristow Community School District.

Schools
It has two schools:
North Butler Elementary School (PK–6) in Alison 
North Butler High School (7–12) in Greene

See also
List of school districts in Iowa

References

External links
 North Butler Community School District
 North Butler School District Map (2010) - Iowa Secretary of State
School districts in Iowa
Education in Butler County, Iowa
Education in Floyd County, Iowa
School districts established in 2011
2011 establishments in Iowa